Zümrüt Cansel (born 23 March 1963) is a Turkish Cypriot actress. Cansel is best known for her roles in the Yeşilçam films. She is the daughter of the Turkish Cypriot actress Feri Cansel.

Personal life
Cansel is married and has three children.

Filmography

References

External links

1963 births
Living people
Turkish film actresses
Actresses from London
British people of Turkish Cypriot descent